Her Little Majesty (Swedish: Hennes lilla majestät) is a 1925 Swedish silent comedy drama film directed by Sigurd Wallén and starring Margita Alfvén, Gunnar Tolnæs and Stina Berg. It was shot at the Råsunda Studios in Stockholm. The film's sets were designed by the art director Vilhelm Bryde. It was remade as a 1939 film of the same title.

Cast
 Margita Alfvén as Catherine 
 Gunnar Tolnæs as Priest 
 Oscar Textorius as Catherine's Father 
 Stina Berg as Housekeeper 
 Ragnar Billberg as Actor 'The First Lover' 
 Carl Browallius as Bishop 
 Olga Andersson as Actress 
 Ragnar Arvedson as Flachert 
 John Borgh
 Gucken Cederborg as Actress 
 Julia Cæsar as Train passenger 
 Felix Grönfeldt
 Eric Gustafson
 Thure Holm
 Axel Jacobsson
 Gustaf Lövås as Actor 
 Olav Riégo as Lieutenant 
 Albert Ståhl as Landfiskal 
 Wilhelm Tunelli
 Signe Törneqvist
 Carl-Gunnar Wingård as Actor

References

Bibliography
 Per Olov Qvist & Peter von Bagh. Guide to the Cinema of Sweden and Finland. Greenwood Publishing Group, 2000.

External links

1925 comedy-drama films
Swedish comedy-drama films
1925 films
Films directed by Sigurd Wallén
Swedish silent feature films
Swedish black-and-white films
Silent comedy-drama films
1920s Swedish films
1920s Swedish-language films